The 2005 Spanish GP2 round was a GP2 Series motor race held on 7 May and 8 May 2005 at the Circuit de Catalunya in Montmeló, Catalonia, Spain. It was the second race of the 2005 GP2 Series season. The race was used to support the 2005 Spanish Grand Prix.

The first race was won by Gianmaria Bruni for Coloni Motorsport, with Scott Speed second for iSport International and Heikki Kovalainen finishing third for Arden International.

The second race was won by José María López for DAMS, with Nelson Ángelo Piquet for Hitech/Piquet Racing and Scott Speed also on the podium.

Classification

Qualifying

Race 1

Race 2

Standings after the round 

Drivers' Championship standings

Teams' Championship standings

 Note: Only the top five positions are included for both sets of standings.

References

External links
 GPUpdate.net

Catalunya Gp2 Round, 2005
Catalunya